Adam Michael Bygrave (born 24 February 1989) is an English footballer who plays as a defender.

Career
Bygrave joined Reading's Youth Academy as a junior, and on 6 July 2007, he signed a one-year professional contract with Reading.

Bygrave joined Gillingham on loan on 20 November 2007 initially for one month. He made his league debut in Gillingham's 2–1 win over Hartlepool United on 24 November 2007, and the loan was then extended for a second month, then a third, then finally extended to the end of the 2007–08 season. However, the loan was then cut short, and Bygrave returned to Reading on 22 April 2008.

He was released by Reading at the end of his current contract, and signed with Conference National side Weymouth on 25 May 2008. He signed for fellow Conference team Histon for a fee of £5,000 on 1 January 2009.

Bygrave signed for Hayes & Yeading United on 2 August 2010.

Out of contract at the end of the 2010–11 season, he followed manager Garry Haylock to Farnborough.

On 27 August 2012 he was sacked by Farnborough after being found to have made "numerous racist, disabled and paedophile based comments on social networking sites which are totally unacceptable in any walk of life," and became a free agent. He re-signed for Hayes & Yeading United in December 2012 after serving a football ban for the offence.

References

External links

1989 births
Living people
English footballers
Association football defenders
Reading F.C. players
Gillingham F.C. players
Weymouth F.C. players
Histon F.C. players
Hayes & Yeading United F.C. players
English Football League players
National League (English football) players
Farnborough F.C. players